Vasaces is a genus of false blister beetles in the family Oedemeridae. There are at least four described species in Vasaces.

Species
These four species belong to the genus Vasaces:
 Vasaces elongatus Arnett, 1953
 Vasaces knulli Arnett, 1953
 Vasaces linearis Arnett, 1953
 Vasaces maculatus Arnett, 1953

References

Further reading

 
 

Oedemeridae
Articles created by Qbugbot